Club de Rugby Les Abelles is a Professional Spanish rugby team based in Valencia, Spain. They play in Spain's top tier of rugby, the División de Honor

The club was founded in 1971 by Halangode Noel, a teacher at the Jesuit School of Valencia. Having been a player for a time at Wasps, he tried to transfer the name and spirit of a group of young students.  

The club's name is the Catalan, not Spanish, translation of Wasps, something which would have been rather a controversial time during the dictatorship of Francisco Franco. 

Noel also intended for the club to wear Wasps' distinctive colours, but in the 1970s another Valencian club, Tatami, already wore a similar kit, and so for many years Abelles played in orange. Today, the team's colours do resemble those of the English club.

Since its foundation, the club has played at both regional and national levels. In the last twenty years the club has spent more than half its seasons in División de Honor B, with occasional relegations and promotions.

In 2020, after Bathco Independiente Rugby Club announced they were unable to compete in Spain's top-flight División de Honor, Abelles gained promotion. This marks the clubs third season in the division, after 2008-09 and 2009-10.

International honours 
  Fernando Dominguez
  Marcos Poggi
  Lucas Martín Poggi

Spanish rugby union teams
Sport in Valencia
Sports teams in the Valencian Community
Rugby clubs established in 1971